Frederik Watz is a Grand Prix motorcycle racer from Sweden.

Career statistics

By season

Races by year
(key)

References

External links
 Profile on motogp.com

1976 births
Living people
Swedish motorcycle racers
250cc World Championship riders
Sportspeople from Linköping
Sportspeople from Östergötland County